Prunus ceylanica is a species of plant in the family Rosaceae. It is a resident species to Sri Lanka and India.

References

Endemic flora of Sri Lanka
ceylanica
Endangered plants
Taxonomy articles created by Polbot